Merindad de Valdeporres is a municipality located in the province of Burgos, Castile and León, Spain. According to the 2004 census (INE), the municipality has a population of 487 inhabitants. Its seat is in Pedrosa de Valdeporres.

References

External links 
 http://valdeporres-blog.blogspot.com.es/

Municipalities in the Province of Burgos